The Six Days of New York was a former six-day cycling event, held in New York City, in Madison Square Garden's velodrome. Between 1899 and 1961, a total of 73 editions were held, sometimes three per year. Only the Six Days of Berlin and the Six Days of Ghent had more runnings. Australian Alfred Goullet and Italian Franco Giorgetti hold the record with eight wins each.

Madison
The madison team event, one of the most popular disciplines in track cycling, was invented during the Six Days of New York and named after the second Madison Square Garden, where the venue was held. In French the discipline is known as the "American race" (course à l'américaine).

Roll of honor

References

Cycle races in the United States
International cycle races hosted by the United States
Six-day races
Defunct cycling races in the United States
Cycling in New York City
Recurring sporting events established in 1899
Recurring sporting events disestablished in 1961
1899 establishments in New York City
1961 disestablishments in New York (state)
Madison Square Garden